Donte Thomas (born May 6, 1996) is an American basketball player who plays for the Heroes Den Bosch of the BNXT League. He played college basketball for the Bradley Braves before turning professional in 2018.

High school career 
Born in Olympia Fields, Illinois, Thomas attended Thornwood High School. He averaged 17 points, 8 rebounds and 3 assists in his junior season in 2012–13 and earned first-team all-area honours.

College career 
Thomas committed to play for the Bradley Braves. In the 2017–18 season, he was named to the Second-Team All-Missouri Valley Conference.

Professional career

KTP
On August 5, 2018, Thomas signed a one-year contract with KTP-Basket of the Finnish Korisliiga. With KTP, Thomas averaged 15.5 points and 8.4 rebounds in 46 Korisliiga games with the team.

At the end of his rookie year, Donte Thomas was invited by the Oklahoma City Thunder to participate in an NBA free agent mini-camp in June, 2019

Donar
On July 6, 2019, Thomas signed a one-year contract with Basketball Champions League and FIBA Europe Cup participant Donar of the Dutch Basketball League (DBL). The 2019–20 DBL season was cancelled prematurely due to the COVID-19 pandemic. In 18 games with Donar, Thomas averaged 15.7 points and 7.4 rebounds per game in 27.6 minutes.

Cantù
On June 22, 2020, Thomas signed with Pallacanestro Cantù of the Italian Lega Basket Serie A (LBA). He averaged 7.0 points and 4.4 rebounds per game.

Return to Donar
On July 22, 2021, Thomas signed with Alba Fehérvár of the Nemzeti Bajnokság I/A (NB I/A). He did not play a game for the club. On November 14, 2021, Thomas returned to Donar after he signed a contract for the remainder of the 2021–22 season. He won the 2021–22 Dutch Basketball Cup with Donar.

Heroes Den Bosch 
On July 28, 2022, he signed a one-year contract with Heroes Den Bosch.

Personal 
Donte is the son of Dontay Thomas and Latoya McCowan and has one sibling. He majored in social work at Bradley.

References

External links
Bradley Braves bio

1996 births
Living people
Alba Fehérvár players
American expatriate basketball people in Finland
American expatriate basketball people in Italy
American expatriate basketball people in the Netherlands
American men's basketball players
Basketball players from Illinois
Bradley Braves men's basketball players
Donar (basketball club) players
Dutch Basketball League players
Heroes Den Bosch players
KTP-Basket players
People from Calumet City, Illinois
Power forwards (basketball)
Sportspeople from Cook County, Illinois